The 1950–51 season was the 43rd year of football played by Dundee United, and covers the period from 1 July 1950 to 30 June 1951. United finished in fourth place in the Second Division.

Match results
Dundee United played a total of 40 competitive matches during the 1950–51 season.

Legend

All results are written with Dundee United's score first.
Own goals in italics

Division B

Scottish Cup

League Cup

See also
 1950–51 in Scottish football

References

Dundee United F.C. seasons
Dundee United